Tadeusz Reichstein (20 July 1897 – 1 August 1996), also known as Tadeus Reichstein, was a Polish-Swiss chemist and the Nobel Prize in Physiology or Medicine laureate (1950), which was awarded for his work on the isolation of cortisone.

Early life
Reichstein was born into a Polish-Jewish family at Włocławek, Russian Empire. His parents were Gastawa (Brockmann) and Izydor Reichstein. He spent his early childhood at Kiev, where his father was an engineer. He began his education at boarding-school in Jena, Germany and arrived in Basel, Switzerland at the age of 8.

Career
Reichstein studied under Hermann Staudinger during the latter's brief stint at the Technical University of Karlsruhe. It was here that he met Leopold Ruzicka, also a doctoral student.

In 1933, working in Zürich, Switzerland, at the ETHZ chemical laboratories of Ruzicka, Reichstein succeeded, independently of Sir Norman Haworth and his collaborators in the United Kingdom, in synthesizing vitamin C (ascorbic acid) in what is now called the Reichstein process. In 1937, he was appointed Associate Professor at ETHZ.

In 1937, Reichstein moved to the University of Basel where he became Professor of Pharmaceutical Chemistry, and then, from 1946 until his retirement in 1967, of Organic Chemistry.

Together with Edward Calvin Kendall and Philip Showalter Hench, he was awarded the Nobel Prize in Physiology or Medicine in 1950 for their work on hormones of the adrenal cortex which culminated in the isolation of cortisone. In 1951, he and Kendall were jointly awarded the Cameron Prize for Therapeutics of the University of Edinburgh.

In later years, Reichstein became interested in the phytochemistry and cytology of ferns, publishing at least 80 papers on these subjects in the last three decades of his life. He had a particular interest in the use of chromosome number and behavior in the interpretation of histories of hybridization and polyploidy, but also continued his earlier interest in the chemical constituents of the plants.

Retirement and death
Reichstein died at the age of 99 in Basel, Switzerland. The principal industrial process for the artificial synthesis of vitamin C still bears his name. Reichstein was the longest-lived Nobel laureate at the time of his death, but was surpassed in 2008 by Rita Levi-Montalcini.

See also
 List of Jewish Nobel laureates
List of Polish Nobel laureates

References

External links 
  including the Nobel Lecture, December 11, 1950 Chemistry of the Adrenal Cortex Hormones
  Tadeus Reichstein article by B. Weintraub

1897 births
1996 deaths
Nobel laureates in Physiology or Medicine
Academic staff of ETH Zurich
Jewish Nobel laureates
Polish Nobel laureates
Swiss Nobel laureates
People from Włocławek
People from Warsaw Governorate
Jews from the Russian Empire
Swiss people of Polish-Jewish descent
Pteridologists
Polish chemists
Jewish chemists
Jewish scientists
ETH Zurich alumni
Foreign Members of the Royal Society
Foreign associates of the National Academy of Sciences
Recipients of the Copley Medal
People associated with the University of Basel